Restless Eyes, released in 1981, is the twelfth studio album by singer/songwriter Janis Ian, and her last album for Columbia Records, although at the time Ian had a contract with the label for four further albums.

At the time of Restless Eyes, Janis Ian had completely disappeared from the United States charts – her previous album Night Rains had not even dented the Billboard Top 200 despite a re-release during the summer of 1980 and a big push by Columbia who had originally released it on a glutted US market in September 1979. Nevertheless, her efforts to adopt a highly commercial pop sound plus a new focus on writing film music had gained Night Rains significant success outside North America.

For her new album, Ian teamed up with producer Gary Klein, who had produced several hit albums for Barbra Streisand, and she saw Restless Eyes as a move back to her folk roots after the pop of Night Rains. The first single, “Under the Covers”, gained publicity in the United States because of its lyrics alluding to the power of Latino lovers, just as “Society's Child” fifteen years previously had depicted interracial relationships. The controversy led Ian to make many appearances on American talk shows at the height of the summer, and despite many radio stations refusing to play the song, “Under the Covers” did gain major airplay in certain other parts of the US; for instance, during mid-July it was the second most played song on one station in Tampa. Although this publicity would make “Under the Covers” Ian’s first Top 100 US single since “At Seventeen” and would see her return to the Billboard Top 200 for three weeks, the publicity soon faded and so did both the album and single.

Restless Eyes would nonetheless remain Ian‘s last charting album in the United States, and indeed her last release there for twelve years, although nothing from Restless Eyes is known to have been performed by Janis in concerts after the album’s tour, and only “Passion Play” has ever appeared on any of her compilations.

Track listing

Charts

Notes

References

1981 albums
Columbia Records albums
Janis Ian albums
Albums produced by Gary Klein (producer)